To Seek a New Home is an album by American organist Brother Jack McDuff recorded in England in 1970 and released on the Blue Note label.

Reception
The Allmusic review awarded the album 3 stars.

Track listing
All compositions by Jack McDuff except as indicated
 "Yellow Wednesday" - 6:35 
 "Come and Carry Me Home" - 4:48 
 "Mystic John" - 5:11 
 "Hunk O' Funk" (J.J. Jackson, McDuff) - 6:20 
 "Seven Keys for Seven Doors" - 10:18
Recorded at Island Studios, London, England on March 23 (track 2), March 24 (track 3), March 25 (track 5), and March 26 (tracks 1 & 4), 1970.

Personnel
Brother Jack McDuff - organ, piano
Martin Drover, Terry Noonan, Bud Parks - trumpet
John Bennett, Adrian Drover - trombone
David Statham, Willie Watson - French horn
Norman Leppard, Dick Morrissey, Jack Whitford, Dave Willis - reeds
Typhena Partridge - harp
J.J. Jackson - piano, percussion
Chris Parren - electric piano
Terry Smith - guitar
Peter Chapman, Larry Steele - electric bass
Trevor Armstrong, Phil Leaford - drums
Debrah Long, Jerry Long - vocals

References

Blue Note Records albums
Jack McDuff albums
1970 albums